The 1994 Alabama Crimson Tide football team represented the University of Alabama for the 1994–95 college football season, competing in the Western Division in the Southeastern Conference. Gene Stallings led the Crimson Tide to a perfect 11–0 regular season, only to see the Crimson Tide lose to the Florida Gators by one point in the SEC Championship Game.  Highlights include a win over then unbeaten Auburn, and a dramatic victory over Georgia which is rebroadcast occasionally as part of the ESPN "Classic" series.  Alabama beat Ohio State in the 1995 Florida Citrus Bowl to finish their 1994 season with a 12–1 record.

The team played their home games at Bryant–Denny Stadium in Tuscaloosa, Alabama, and Legion Field in Birmingham, Alabama.

Schedule

Source: Rolltide.com: 1994 Alabama football schedule

Roster

Starters
Players who started at their respective position in the 1994 season.

Rankings

Game summaries

vs. Ohio State (Citrus Bowl)

References

Alabama
Alabama Crimson Tide football seasons
Citrus Bowl champion seasons
Alabama Crimson Tide football